Peter A. Ing (born April 28, 1969) is a Canadian former professional ice hockey goaltender. He played 74 games in the National Hockey League with the Toronto Maple Leafs, Edmonton Oilers, and Detroit Red Wings between 1989 and 1993.

Biography
Ing was born in Toronto, Ontario of mixed ancestry. His father was Chinese and mother was Jewish. As a youth, Ing played in the 1982 Quebec International Pee-Wee Hockey Tournament with a minor ice hockey team from Barrie.

Ing was selected in the third round, 48th overall, by the Toronto Maple Leafs in the 1988 NHL Entry Draft, and joined Toronto in 1989. He briefly played for the Edmonton Oilers and the Detroit Red Wings. His later career was spent in the International Hockey League and the American Hockey League.

Ing retired from hockey and worked at a casino in Las Vegas, Nevada and later as director of slot marketing at Casino Niagara.

Career statistics

Regular season and playoffs

References

External links
 

1969 births
Living people
Adirondack Red Wings players
Canadian ice hockey goaltenders
Canadian sportspeople of Chinese descent
Cape Breton Oilers players
Cincinnati Cyclones (IHL) players
Detroit Red Wings players
Edmonton Oilers players
Fort Wayne Komets players
Jewish ice hockey players
Las Vegas Thunder players
London Knights players
Newmarket Saints players
San Diego Gulls (IHL) players
Ice hockey people from Toronto
Toronto Maple Leafs draft picks
Toronto Maple Leafs players
Windsor Spitfires players